The 2022–23 Piala Indonesia will be the ninth edition of Piala Indonesia, the nationwide club football tournament in Indonesia, involving clubs from Liga 1, Liga 2, and Liga 3. 64 clubs will enter this competition. The winner will qualify for the 2023–24 AFC Cup.

PSM are the defending champions after winning the 2018–19 Piala Indonesia, as the 2020 edition was cancelled due to the COVID-19 pandemic in Indonesia.

The tournament was planned to be held between August 2022 and March 2023. In late August 2022, the tournament was cancelled due to lack of sponsor after the participating clubs were announced in July 2022. However, PSSI changed its decision regarding the tournament and chose to keep it taking place. But PSSI was constrained by costs and threatened the tournament to be cancelled for a second time, considering that it almost neared the end of the first round. It is not yet clear whether the financing problem in question has anything to do with the sponsorship issue mentioned earlier or not. There is concern that a sponsor who is willing to help in holding the tournament will not be.

Calendar

Participating clubs
The following 64 clubs will participate for the competition.

See also
 2022–23 Liga 1
 2022–23 Liga 2
 2022–23 Liga 3

References

Piala Indonesia seasons
Piala Indonesia
Piala Indonesia